Herpetogramma bermudalis is a moth in the family Crambidae. It was described by Harrison Gray Dyar Jr. in 1915. It is found in Bermuda.

References

Moths described in 1915
Herpetogramma
Moths of the Caribbean